Jhony Alberto Obeso Panduro (born 2 June 1991) is a Peruvian footballer who plays as a midfielder. He currently plays for Peruvian club Deportivo Garcilaso.

Club career
Obeso joined the José Gálvez FBC first team in January 2010. His debut came under manager Julio César Uribe in the 1st round of the season coming on as a substitute for Santiago Salazar. However, he could not help his side overturn the 2–1 loss away to Boys.

References

External links
 

1991 births
Living people
Peruvian footballers
José Gálvez FBC footballers
Carlos A. Mannucci players
Alianza Universidad footballers
Cienciano footballers
Alfonso Ugarte de Puno players
Peruvian Primera División players
Association football midfielders
Deportivo Garcilaso players